The 1908-1909 season was the second season for Fenerbahçe. The club played some friendly matches against local clubs.

Friendly Matches

Kick-off listed in local time (EEST)

Friendly Matches

Kick-off listed in local time (EEST)

Friendly Matches

Kick-off listed in local time (EEST)

Kick-off listed in local time (EEST)

External links
 Fenerbahçe Sports Club Official Website 
 Fenerbahçe matches archive 

Fenerbahçe S.K. (football) seasons
Fener